Cyclostrema cingulatum is a species of sea snail, a marine gastropod mollusk in the family Liotiidae.

Description
The diameter of the shell is 1.5 mm. The shell is narrowly umbilicated, with radiating low, broadly rounded undulations above, scalloping the periphery. The shell is quadricarinate in the adults, bicarinate in the young, the carinae being more acuate, sinuately dentate, and dotted with brown. The aperture is subcircular in the adult.

Distribution
This species occurs in the Red Sea and in the Indian Ocean off Madagascar.

References

 Dautzenberg, Ph. (1929). Contribution à l'étude de la faune de Madagascar: Mollusca marina testacea. Faune des colonies françaises, III (fasc. 4). Société d'Editions géographiques, maritimes et coloniales: Paris. 321–636, plates IV-VII pp.

External links

cingulatum
Gastropods described in 1852